Sasajima (written: 笹島) is a Japanese surname. Notable people with the surname include:

 (born 1952), Japanese jazz guitarist
 (born 1973), Japanese voice actress

Japanese-language surnames